William Cookson (died February 1820) was a Canon of Windsor from 1792 to 1820.

Career
He was educated at St John’s College, Cambridge.

He was appointed:
Rector of Forcett St Peter and St Mary, Norfolk
Rector of West Ilsley 1808
Rector of Binfield

He was appointed to the eighth stall in St George's Chapel, Windsor Castle in 1792 and held the canonry until 1820.

Notes 

1820 deaths
Canons of Windsor
Alumni of St John's College, Cambridge
Year of birth unknown